Witchburner is an EP from Swedish heavy metal supergroup Witchery, released in 1999.  The track listing consists of four cover songs, followed by three original songs.

Track listing 
 "Fast as a Shark" (Accept) – 4:34
 Originally released on the Restless and Wild album; written by Hoffman, Kaufmann, Dirkschneider, Baltes. 
 "I Wanna Be Somebody" (W.A.S.P.) – 3:14
 Originally released on the W.A.S.P. album; written by Blackie Lawless
 "Riding on the Wind" (Judas Priest) – 2:49
 Originally released on the Screaming for Vengeance album; written by Glenn Tipton, Rob Halford, K.K. Downing
 "Neon Knights" (Black Sabbath) – 3:53
 Originally released on the  Heaven and Hell album; music: Butler, Dio, Iommi, Ward; lyrics: Ronnie James Dio)
 The Howling – 3:24
 The Executioner – 3:16
 Witchburner – 4:11

Personnel
 Toxine – vocals
 Jensen – riff guitar
 Richard Corpse – solo guitars
 Sharlee D'Angelo – bass guitar
 Mique – drums
 Andy LaRocque – engineer

References

Witchery albums